Rayegan, also rendered as Raykan, may refer to:
 Rayegan, Kermanshah
 Rayegan-e Olya, Hamadan Province
 Rayegan-e Sofla, Hamadan Province
Masoud Rayegan, Iranian actor